Mərzili is a village in the Aghdam District of Azerbaijan.

History 
Mərzili was part of the Shusha Uyezd of Elisabethpol Governorate during the Russian Empire. According to 1886 census data, there were 273 homes and 1,079 Azerbaijanis (classified as "Tatars" in the census) of the Shiite branch of Islam in Mərzili. According to the 1912 "Caucasian Calendar", the village of Mərzili was home to 1,625 people, the majority of whom were Azerbaijanis (classified as "Tatars" in the census).

Mərzili was part of the village council of the same name in the Aghdam District of the Azerbaijan SSR during the early Soviet period in 1933. The village had 174 farms and a total population of 2,221 people. The population of the village council was 100 percent Azerbaijani.

The village had 3,400 residents in 1981. Its residents' main occupations were viticulture, agriculture, animal husbandry, and sericulture. There was a middle school, a vocational school, a cultural centre, two libraries, a sheep-breeding complex, a communication department, and a hospital in the village.

During the First Nagorno-Karabakh War on 11 June 1993, Armenian forces occupied the village, forcing the Azerbaijani population to flee. It was later incorporated into the self-proclaimed Republic of Artsakh as part of its Martuni Province, where it remained a ghost village. Mərzili was returned to Azerbaijan on 20 November 2020 as part of the 2020 Nagorno-Karabakh ceasefire agreement.

Demographics

Notable natives 
 Khudu Mammadov – Scientist and screenwriter

References

External links 
 

Populated places in Aghdam District